Sevil Soyer (born 1950) is a Turkish interdisciplinary artist. Soyer has had solo exhibitions and group exhibitions along with several installations in Turkey and the United States.

Early life 
She was born in Turkey and graduated in 1979 from Mimar Sinan Fine Arts University.

Career 
In 1993 Soyer and Onay Sozer, a philosophy professor in Istanbul University, worked together on the manifesto of “Inter-disciplinary-art”. In 1994 Soyer created the “Ah Guzel Istanbul” (Interdisciplinary Art Exhibition) with 40 Turkish artists. This exhibition was supported by the Ministry of Culture of Turkey.

At the end of 1999, Sevil Soyer moved to Michigan in the United States. She continued her art work in Finlandia University with sculpture and fiber. In 2004 she founded an art gallery in Michigan and worked with the local artists.

In 2007, she set up an art and glass studio in Istanbul and has done flame work and painting there.

Soyer's contemporary figurative paintings make use of oil color and acrylic techniques. Her paintings are in private, national, and international collections.

She has been a member of the UNESCO (IAA Turkey) Association Internationale des Arts Plastiques, since 2003.

Select exhibitions

Solo exhibitions 
 2007–2008 – “Scrapbook” Mixed media Painting Exhibition, Turquoise Art Gallery, Michigan, United States
 1987 – “Painting Exhibition” Vakko Art Gallery, Istanbul, Turkey
 1983 – “Painting Exhibition” – Bodrum Underwater Archeological Museum, Bodrum, Turkey
 1983  – Turkuvaz Art Gallery, Ankara, Turkey
 1979  – Taksim Art Gallery, Istanbul, Turkey
 1977  – Taksim Art Gallery, Istanbul, Turkey
 1977 – Izmir Painting and Sculpture Museum, Turkey

Installations and performance exhibitions
 2003 –  “Purple Rain” Interdisciplinary Art Performance by Sevil Soyer, Turquoise Art Gallery, Michigan, United States
 1995 “Prolog” Installation – Uludağ University Fine Arts Faculty, Bursa, Turkey
 1994  “Oh, Beautiful Istanbul” The 1st Interdisciplinary Art Performance by Sevil Soyer, Yildiz Palace, Istanbul, Turkey
 1994 “Made in Sections II” Installation – Istanbul Technical University, Istanbul, Turkey
 1994 “Made in Sections I” Crossings – Installation - Istanbul, Turkey
 1979 “Istanbul 2nd Art Festival” Installation – Istanbul, Turkey

Group exhibitions
 2000 “Corridor” Group Painting Exhibition – Manhattan, New York, United States
 1995 “Masters of Masters” Painting Exhibition – Istanbul, Turkey
 1983 “4th Contemporary Art  Festival” – Istanbul, Turkey
 1982 “Our Studio” Painting Exhibition – Istanbul, Turkey
 1981 “Abdi Ipekci Painting Exhibition” – Istanbul, Turkey
 1980 “Golden Palette Painting Competition and Exhibition”– Istanbul, Turkey
 1980 "DYO Painting Exhibition” – Istanbul, Turkey
 1979 “Our Studio”Painting Exhibition – Taksim, Istanbul, Turkey
 1978 “DYO Painting Exhibition” – Istanbul, Turkey
 1976 “Istanbul Archeological Museum Painting Competition & Exhibition” – Istanbul, Turkey
 1974  “DYO Painting Exhibition” – Istanbul, Turkey

Awards
 3rd Place Award 1980 “Golden Palette Painting Competition and Exhibition”– Istanbul, Turkey
 1st Place Award. 1976 “Istanbul Archeological Museum Painting Competition & Exhibition” – Istanbul, Turkey

See also 
 Turkish women in fine arts

References

Sources 

 Ozsezgin, Kaya. "Turk Plastik Sanatcilari Ansiklopedik Sozluk". YKY Yayinlari 2nd Edition. Istanbul, 1994, pg.423  (Turkish, "Encyclopedia of Turkish Visual Artist")
 "Ah Guzel Istanbul", Catalog of Experimental-Interdisciplinary Art Exhibition.Istanbul, 1994. By the Committee of Istanbul Cultural Heritage 1993-2003 and Ministry Of Culture Turkey.

External links 
 Official website

1950 births
Living people
20th-century Turkish women artists
21st-century Turkish women artists
Turkish women painters
Artists from Istanbul
Mimar Sinan Fine Arts University
Interdisciplinary artists